Eden Girloanta (born 22 October 2000) is an Israeli swimmer. She represented Israel at the 2017 World Aquatics Championships in Budapest, Hungary and at the 2019 World Aquatics Championships in Gwangju, South Korea. In 2019, she competed in the women's 10 km event and she finished in 38th place. She also competed in the women's 5 km event and she finished in 35th place.

References 

Living people
2000 births
Place of birth missing (living people)
Israeli female swimmers
Female long-distance swimmers